Brandy for the Parson is a 1952 British comedy film directed by John Eldridge and starring Kenneth More, Charles Hawtrey, James Donald and Jean Lodge. It was based on a short story by Geoffrey Household from Tales of Adventurers (1952). The title is a reference to the refrain of the poem "A Smuggler's Song" by Rudyard Kipling.

Plot
Bill and Petronilla are a young couple on a yachting holiday. They agree to give a lift to friendly Tony and his cargo, who unbeknownst to them is a brandy smuggler. Before they know it, the couple are fleeing cross-country, chased by customs men.

Main cast
 James Donald as Bill Harper
 Kenneth More as Tony Rackham
 Jean Lodge as Petronilla Brand
 Frederick Piper as Customs inspector
 Charles Hawtrey as George Crumb
 Michael Trubshawe as Redworth
 Alfie Bass as Dallyn
 Wilfrid Caithness as Mr. Minch
 Lionel Harris as Mr. Frost
 Richard Molinas as Massaud
 Reginald Beckwith as Scoutmaster
 Stanley Lemin as Customs officer
 Arthur Wontner as  Major Glockleigh
 Frank Tickle as Vicar
 Amy Dalby as Postmistress
 Wensley Pithey as Circus owner
 Sam Kydd as Lorry driver

Production
It was made at Southall Studios in Middlesex.

John Grierson, head of Group Three, said "I hope it will be in the Jerome K. Jerome tradition.

Critical reception
Variety said if the film "is a fair sample of" Group 3's "output, the government’s confidence has been fully justified, for this is &n amiable entertainment. It should do pleasing business: at home despite the absence of prominent marquee names. Pic should also prove a hit in American art houses."

Allmovie called it "wafer-thin comedy"; and The New York Times called it "a mild but tasty distillate." Picture Show magazine found it "well acted against a delightful background of English scenery, beautifully photographed", and the film's executive producer John Grierson described it as "a sweet lemon of a picture" with a feel of "old oak and seaweed".

References

External links

Review of film at Variety

1952 films
1952 romantic comedy films
British crime comedy films
British romantic comedy films
1950s English-language films
Films set in England
Films set in London
Seafaring films
1950s crime comedy films
British black-and-white films
Films directed by John Eldridge
1950s British films